Maínis or Mweenish is an island off the Conamara coast in the heart of the Conamara Gaeltacht. The island is close to Carna and linked to the mainland by a bridge. It is noted for its isolation and rugged beauty.

Notable people
Colman Ó Cathasaig

References

Islands of County Galway